Abacetus tetraspilus is a species of ground beetle in the subfamily Pterostichinae. It was described by Andrewes in 1929.

References

tetraspilus
Beetles described in 1929